"Black and White" is a single by the heavy metal band Static-X. It is the first single from their second album, Machine. The music video for the song shows the band one by one waking up from a hypnosis state of mind, beginning to perform and then slowly turning into robots, resembling those seen in the Terminator movies. The video was directed by Len Wiseman.

Track listing
 "Black and White"
 "Anything but This"
 "Sweat of the Bud" (live)

Black and White DVD
"Black and White" has also appeared in form of a DVD release which contained video for the track "Black and White", "Permanence" audio version and video snippets of "This Is Not", "Push It" and I'm with Stupid".

Chart performance

References

Static-X songs
2001 singles
2001 songs
Warner Records singles
Songs written by Tony Campos
Songs written by Ken Jay
Songs written by Wayne Static